Panagiotis Bekiaris (born 8 July 1980) is a Greek former professional footballer who played as a forward.

References

1980 births
Living people
Greek footballers
Iraklis Thessaloniki F.C. players
Apollon Smyrnis F.C. players
Agrotikos Asteras F.C. players
Apollon Pontou FC players
Anagennisi Epanomi F.C. players
Association football forwards
Super League Greece players
Footballers from Thessaloniki